The 63rd Separate Mechanized Brigade is a brigade of the Ukrainian Ground Forces formed in 2017.

History 
The brigade participated in the strategic command and staff exercise "Cossack Will" once more in September 2019 as the main unit, which was utilized during the practical phase. The fact that the units were outfitted with their own weapons and military hardware marked a significant departure from 2017. The staff demonstrated high skill, tenacity, and the capacity to successfully complete tasks as assigned. The brigade received high praise from both the exercise leadership and the command of the Ground Forces of the Ukrainian Armed Forces, according to the exercise results.

Structure 
As of 2023, the brigade's structure is as follows:

 63rd Separate Mechanized Brigade
 Headquarters & Headquarters Company
 1st Mechanized Battalion
 2nd Mechanized Battalion
 3rd Mechanized Battalion
 Tank Battalion
 Artillery Group
 Anti-Aircraft Defense Battalion
 Reconnaissance Company
 Engineer Battalion
 Logistic Battalion
 Signal Company
 Maintenance Battalion
 Radar Company
 Medical Company
 CBRN Protection Company

References 

Military units and formations of the 2022 Russian invasion of Ukraine
Military units and formations of Ukraine
Military of Ukraine